Ban Mo is the name of a street and its corresponding neighbourhood in Bangkok's Wang Burapha Phirom Subdistrict, Phra Nakhon District. It is located just outside the old inner moat in the historic Rattanakosin Island area. It passes the beginning of Phahurat Road at Ban Mo Intersection. It can be considered a road with one-way traffic management.

The area was settled during the Thonburi period by Mon and Vietnamese settlers, whose primary trade was pottery. The area thus became known as Ban Mo, meaning "pottery village". The trade later shifted to goldworking, as well as diamond jewellery. Today, the neighbourhood has become a well known centre of shops specialising in electronics and audio equipment.

At present, remaining evidence of pottery is a pot sculpture on the gable of the entrance gate Ban Mo Market.

Moreover, Ban Mo was also site the first headquarters of Siam Commercial Bank (SCB) in 1904 as Book Club (now, the building is adjacent to Saowabha Vocational College) before moving to Talat Noi in Yaowarat neighbourhood soon after. Today's Siam Commercial Bank, Talat Noi Branch. And also home to the San Chao Por Ban Mo Lao Pun Tao Kong (pinyin: wàn mào lǎo běn tóu gōng gǔ miào), Teochew's joss house is believed to be the oldest in Bangkok established since 1816.

References

Neighbourhoods of Bangkok
Streets in Bangkok
Phra Nakhon district